Aleksander Grigoryevich Kopatzky (1923-1982) was a Soviet double agent who was unmasked in 1961 by Anatoliy Golitsyn. Kopatzky also used the names Igor Orlov, Aleksandr Navratilov and Calvus, and his Soviet codenames were Erwin, Herbert and Richard.

In 1941, after the start of the German-Soviet War, Kopazky attended a Soviet training school for agents of the NKVD. In October 1943 he was on a parachute jump over occupied Kresy, but the German Wehrmacht arrested him, and he was taken as a prisoner-of-war. From 1944, he acted as an agent of the Department of Foreign Armies against the Red Army in Vlasov’s Army. In 1945, he came into American captivity and came into contact with the Gehlen Organization into which he was recruited by 1948.

He married Eleanor Stirner, the daughter of a former SS functionary.

In 1949, Kopazky was recruited by the KGB and became one of its most important double agents. The CIA sent him to Berlin in 1951 under the name Franz Koischwitz. He was officially shut down in late 1951 as an agent but still kept his jobs. On 7 November 1951, he kidnapped the Estonian CIA agent Vlkadimir Kivi from West Berlin to East Berlin on behalf of the KGB. In 1954, with the help of the CIA, he changed his name to Igor Orlov. In 1957, he attended agent training in the US and was reinstated in 1958 to Europe. In 1960, he was transferred back to the US where he continued to work for the FBI and CIA.

As a result of the defection of the former KGB agent Anatoliy Golitsyn, the FBI sought Kopazky, who was suspected of being the Soviet mole, ″Sasha″, whom James Jesus Angleton had failed to uncover. After a house search in 1965, he fled for a short time in the Soviet consulate. He refused a flight to the Soviet Union, however, and remained in the United States. Until his death in 1982, he lived with his wife in Alexandria, Virginia, where they owned an art gallery and frame shop.

See also
 List of Eastern Bloc defectors
 The Company (TV miniseries)

References 

 Helmut Roewer, Stefan Schäfer, Matthias Uhl, Encyclopedia of intelligence in the 20th Century Herbig, München 2003, .
 David E. Murphy, Sergei A. Kondrashev, and George Bailey, Battleground Berlin: CIA vs. KGB in the Cold War. New Haven, CT: Yale University Press, 1997.
 Joseph J. Trento: The Secret History of the CIA. Carroll & Graf Publishers Inc., New York 2005, .
 David E. Murphy, "Sasha who?",  Intelligence and National Security, 8(1), 1993, p. 102-07 Routledge.
 Christopher Andrew and Vasili Mitrokhin, The Sword and the Shield: The Mitrokhin Archive and the Secret History of the KGB, Basic Books, New York, 1999 (published in United Kingdom as The Mitrokhin Archive: The KGB in Europe and the West, Allen Lane/Penguin Press, London, 1999), pp. 21, 148-149, 176-177
 David E. Murphy, "The Hunt for Sasha Is Over." CIRA Newsletter 25, no. 3 (Fall 2000): 11-15.

Double agents
NKVD officers
People of the Central Intelligence Agency
1923 births
1982 deaths
Russian collaborators with Nazi Germany
Soviet prisoners of war
Soviet collaborators with Nazi Germany
Soviet emigrants to the United States
Soviet spies against the United States